John Taber (May 5, 1880 – November 22, 1965) was an American attorney and New York politician who represented parts of the Finger Lakes and Central New York regions in the United States House of Representatives from 1923 to 1963.

Biography
Taber was born in Auburn, New York on May 5, 1880, the son of attorney and businessman Franklin P. Taber and Susan (Parker) Taber.  He attended the public schools of Auburn, and graduated from Auburn High School in 1898.  He graduated from Yale University in 1902, and received his law degree from New York Law School in 1904.  He attained admission to the bar in November 1914, and commenced practice in Auburn.

Taber represented Auburn's second ward on the Cayuga County Board of Supervisors in 1905 and 1906.  From 1910 to 1918, he served as a special judge of the county court.  Taber was a delegate to the Republican National Conventions in 1920, 1924, and 1936, and chairman of the Cayuga County Republican Committee from 1920 to 1925.  In 1922, he was chosen to serve as president of the Auburn Chamber of Commerce.

He represented New York in the House of Representatives as a Republican from the 68th to the 87th Congresses (March 4, 1923 – January 3, 1963), where he was the chairman of the Committee on Appropriations during the 80th and 83rd Congresses. He was not a candidate for renomination to the 88th Congress in 1962. Taber voted against of the Civil Rights Acts of 1957 and 1960, as well as the 24th Amendment to the U.S. Constitution.

Taber died in Auburn on November 22, 1965, and was interred at Fort Hill Cemetery in Auburn.

Family
In 1929, Taber married Gertrude Johnson Beard (1893-1964), who had been working as his secretary.  They were the parents of a son, Charles Beard Taber (1920-1969).

Notes

References

Bibliography
Congressman John Taber of Auburn: Politics and Federal Appropriations, 1923–1962, Cary S. Henderson, Ph.D. dissertation, Duke University, 1964.

1880 births
1965 deaths
Politicians from Auburn, New York
Yale University alumni
New York Law School alumni
New York (state) state court judges
Republican Party members of the United States House of Representatives from New York (state)
20th-century American judges
Auburn High School (Auburn, New York) alumni
20th-century American politicians